LG2 or variation, may refer to:

 La Grande-2 generating station (LG-2), Quebec, Canada
 Lehrgeschwader 2 (LG 2), German WWII Luftwaffe air wing
 Lechia II Gdańsk (LG2) soccer team
 Gibson LG-2 acoustic guitar, see Gibson L Series
 Buick LG2, a Buick V6 engine
 binary logarithm (lg2)
 Laminin G domain 2 (LG2)
 Lg2, a virulent strain of the fish pathogen Lactococcus garvieae
 Second late glacial (LG2), a period of the Older Dryas ice age
 Lower Group 2, of the Bushveld Igneous Complex
 Taipei Botanical Garden metro station (station code LG02) on the Wanda–Zhonghe–Shulin line in Taipei, Taiwan
 Alūksne District (LG02), Latvia; see List of FIPS region codes (J–L)

See also

 2LG
 LG (disambiguation)
 LGG (disambiguation)

 IG2